Mikhaylovka 1-ya is a rural locality (a selo) and the administrative center of Progressovskoye Rural Settlement, Paninsky District, Voronezh Oblast, Russia. The population was 607 as of 2010. There are 9 streets.

Geography 
Mikhaylovka 1-ya is located 21 km east of Panino (the district's administrative centre) by road. Maryevka is the nearest rural locality.

References 

Rural localities in Paninsky District